Bukittinggi (Jawi: , formerly ) is the third largest city in West Sumatra, Indonesia, with a population of 111,312 in 2010 and 121,028 in 2020, and an area of 25.24 km2. It is in the Minangkabau Highlands, 90 km by road from the West Sumatran capital city of Padang. At 930 m above sea level, the city has a cool climate with temperatures between 16.1° to 24.9 °C.

Bukittinggi used to be known as Fort de Kock and was once dubbed ''. The city was the capital of Indonesia during the Emergency Government of the Republic of Indonesia (PDRI). Before it became the capital of PDRI, the city was a centre of government at the time of the Dutch East Indies and during the Japanese colonial period.

Bukittinggi is also known as a leading tourist city in West Sumatra. It is twinned with Seremban in Negeri Sembilan, Malaysia. The Jam Gadang, a clock tower located in the heart of the city, is a symbol for the city and a well-visited tourist spot.

The city is the birthplace of Mohammad Hatta, Indonesian co-proclamator and Assaat, then Indonesian (acting) president. Koto Gadang village in the southwest of city produces an abundance of statesmen, ministers, doctors, economist, artist and scholars who make great contribution to Indonesia, namely Sutan Sjahrir, Agus Salim, Bahder Djohan, Rohana Kudus, Emil Salim, Dr. Syahrir, etc.

History
The city has its origins in five villages that served as the basis for a marketplace. It was known as Fort de Kock in colonial times in reference to the Dutch outpost established here in 1825 during the Padri War. 

The fort was founded by Captain Bauer at the top of Jirek hill and later named after the then Lieutenant Governor-General of the Dutch East Indies, Hendrik Merkus de Kock. The first road connecting the region with the west coast was built between 1833 and 1841 via the Anai Gorge, easing troop movements, cutting the costs of transportation and providing an economic stimulus for the agricultural economy. 

In 1856 a teacher-training college (Kweekschool) was founded in the city, the first in Sumatra, as part of a policy to provide education opportunities to the indigenous population. A rail line connecting the city with Payakumbuh and Padang was constructed between 1891 and 1894.

During the Japanese occupation of Indonesia in World War II, the city was the headquarters for the Japanese 25th Army, the force that occupied Sumatra. The headquarters was moved to the city in April 1943 from Singapore and remained until the Japanese surrender in August 1945.

During the Indonesian National Revolution, the city saw a failed coup attempt by Islamist militias against the Indonesian republican government in 1947. During the second 'Police Action' Dutch forces invaded and occupied the city on 22 December 1948, having earlier bombed it in preparation. The city was surrendered to Republican officials in December 1949 after the Dutch government recognised Indonesian sovereignty.

The city was officially renamed Bukittinggi in 1949, replacing its colonial name. From 1950 until 1957, Bukittinggi was the capital city of a province called Central Sumatra, which encompassed West Sumatra, Riau and Jambi. In February 1958, during a revolt in Sumatra against the Indonesian government, rebels proclaimed the Revolutionary Government of the Republic of Indonesia (PRRI) in Bukittinggi. The Indonesian government had recaptured the town by May the same year.

A group of Muslim men had planned to bomb a cafe in the city frequented by foreign tourists in October 2007, but the plot was aborted due to the risk of killing Muslim individuals in the vicinity. Since 2008 the city administration has banned Valentine's Day and New Year's celebrations as they consider them not in line with Minangkabau traditions or Islam that can lead to "immoral acts" such as young couples hugging and kissing.

Administrative districts

Bukittinggi is divided into three districts (kecamatan), which are further divided into five villages (nagari) and 24 kelurahan. The districts are tabulated below with their areas and their populations at the 2010 Census and the 2020 Census.

Transportation
Bukittinggi is connected to Padang by road. Up until early 1980s there was a railway service from Padang Panjang that used to serve the city. For inner-city transport, Bukittinggi employs a public transportation system known as "Mersi" (Merapi Singgalang) and "IKABE" that connect locations within the city. The city preserves the traditional horse-cart widely known in the area as Bendi, although the use is limited and more popular with tourists, both domestic and foreign.

Tourism
It is a city popular with tourists due to the climate and central location. Bukittinggi is also a popular shopping destination due to cheap textile and fashion products, especially for Malaysian. Best way to see Bukittinggi is by motorbike, car or by foot (trekkings). Attractions within the city include:

 Ngarai Sianok (Sianok Canyon)
 Lubang Jepang (Japanese Caves) — a network of underground bunkers and tunnels built by the Japanese during World War II
 Jam Gadang — a large clock tower built by the Dutch in 1926.
 Pasar Atas and Pasar Aur Kuning are traditional markets downtown.
 Taman Bundo Kanduang park. The park includes a replica Rumah Gadang (literally: big house) with the distinctive Minangkabau roof architecture) used as a museum of Minangkabau culture and a zoo. The Dutch hilltop outpost Fort de Kock is connected to the zoo by the Limpapeh Bridge pedestrian overpass.
 Museum Rumah Kelahiran Bung Hatta (Museum of Bung Hatta Birthplace), the house where Indonesian founding father Mohammad Hatta was born, now a museum.
 Janjang Koto Gadang also known as Great Wall of Koto Gadang. It is like a miniature of Chinese great wall, with hundred-step stairs connects Taman Panorama and Koto Gadang village.

Notable nearby destinations include Lake Maninjau, Lake Tarusan, Kamang Cave, and Tarang Cave.

Sister cities
 Seremban, Malaysia

References

External links

Pemerintah Bukittinggi - Bukittinggi City Council 

CPNS Pemko Bukittinggi